is a railway station in Nishiyodogawa-ku, Osaka Prefecture, Japan.

Lines
Hanshin Electric Railway
Main Line

Layout

Adjacent stations

|-
!colspan=5|Hanshin Electric Railway

Railway stations in Japan opened in 1905
Railway stations in Osaka Prefecture